Derek Rain Thompson (born January 8, 1981) is a former Major League Baseball pitcher.

He was drafted by the Cleveland Indians in the 1st round of the 2000 Major League Baseball Draft and pitched in the Indians minor league system for the Burlington Indians (2000), Columbus Indians (2001–2002) and Kinston Indians (2002). He was drafted by the Chicago Cubs in the Rule 5 draft on December 16, 2002, and then sold to the Los Angeles Dodgers. For the Dodgers he played for the Jacksonville Suns in 2004 & 2005, appearing in the Southern League All-Star Game in 2004.

Thompson pitched briefly for Triple-A Las Vegas in 2005 before he was called up to the Los Angeles Dodgers. He started 3 games for the Dodgers in 2005. He was released by the Dodgers after the season, and signed a minor league contract with the Oakland Athletics.

References

External links

1981 births
Living people
Los Angeles Dodgers players
Major League Baseball pitchers
Baseball players from Tampa, Florida
Burlington Indians players (1986–2006)
Columbus RedStixx players
Jacksonville Suns players
Kinston Indians players
Las Vegas 51s players